Presilphiperfolanol synthase (EC 4.2.3.74, BcBOT2, CND15) is an enzyme with systematic name (2E,6E)-farnesyl-diphosphate diphosphohydrolase (presilphiperfolan-8β-ol-forming). This enzyme catalyses the following chemical reaction

 (2E,6E)-farnesyl diphosphate + H2O  presilphiperfolan-8β-ol + diphosphate

This enzyme requires Mg2+.

References

External links 
 

EC 4.2.3